The 1986 Kouros 1000 km was the second round of the 1986 World Sports-Prototype Championship.  It took place at the Silverstone Circuit, Great Britain on May 5, 1986.

Official results
Class winners in bold.  Cars failing to complete 75% of the winner's distance marked as Not Classified (NC).

Statistics
 Pole Position - Alessandro Nannini (#4 Martini Racing) - 1:10.810
 Fastest Lap - Andrea De Cesaris (#4 Martini Racing) - 1:13.950
 Average Speed - 207.739 km/h

References

 
 

Silverstone
Silverstone
Silverstone
6 Hours of Silverstone